Laurie Bellotti (born 28 February 1976) is a former Australian rules footballer who played with the West Coast Eagles in the Australian Football League (AFL).

An Indigenous Australian, Bellotti was a utility player who hailed had excelled at basketball back home in Carnarvon. He was a member of the Claremont Colts premiership side of 1996 and played a full season for the seniors in 1998.

Bellotti played 15 games for the Eagles in 1999, as a rookie, but was promoted from the rookie list after the season ended. He appeared in only nine more games in the AFL and finished his career at West Perth.

References

1976 births
Australian rules footballers from Western Australia
West Coast Eagles players
Claremont Football Club players
West Perth Football Club players
Indigenous Australian players of Australian rules football
Living people
People from Carnarvon, Western Australia